Chaetoduvalius soetosas is a species of beetle in the family Carabidae, the only species in the genus Chaetoduvalius.

References

Trechinae